Olivia Trummer (born 12 June 1985 in Stuttgart) is a German Jazz musician (pianist, vocalist, composer).

Biography 
Trummer was raised in a family of musicians and was honored five times at Jugend musiziert as a federal award winner. Since 2003 she studied jazz piano as well as classical piano at the Hochschule für Musik und Darstellende Kunst Stuttgart. In 2008/2009 she completed a master's degree at the Manhattan School of Music.  All courses she graduated with honors. During her studies in 2004 and 2006, she was commissioned to write compositions for stage and film music.

With her trio she performs her own English and German jazz songs as well as her own arrangements of classical works, such as Mozart, Bach or Ligeti. Since her third albumNobody Knows  the pianist is also heard as a singer, where she promotes the jazz song "by ludicrous melody jumps and bold Scat-coloratura in the Lied area.“ Besides her trio she also performed with the Ensemble Eichendorff (with Claudio Puntin, Libor Šíma as well as Bodek Janke) and in duo with Janke in appearance. She also plays concerts as a soloist and as a duo with the Swiss vibraphone player Jean-Lou Treboux. She was also on tour with the band East Drive. Since autumn 2016 she has been touring the world with the band Caipi of Kurt Rosenwinkel. She gave concerts in the Carnegie Hall, in Schloss Elmau and in the Liederhalle Stuttgart as well as jazz festivals in Germany, England, Ireland, the Czech Republic, Russia, Japan, China and the USA.

Honors 
Trummer became the second prizewinner at the International Piano Competition Palma D’Oro in Italien ausgezeichnet in 2008. She was a scholarship holder of the DAAD in 2009 and received grants from the Kunststiftung Baden-Württemberg and the Bruno Frey Foundation in 2010. Her album Westwind  was referred to as excellent on the leaderboard of the third quarter of 2008 at Preis der Deutschen Schallplattenkritik. In 2014 she was the first national advertised by the city of Ingolstadt Ingolstädter Jazzpreis 2014.

Discography 

 Nach Norden (Neuklang 2005), (Neuklang 2006, with Joel Locher, Marcel Gustke and Libor Sima)
 Westwind (Neuklang 2008, with Joel Locher, Bodek Janke, and Matthias Schriefl)
 Nobody Knows (2010; with Antonio Miguel, Bodek Janke, Matthias Schriefl)
 Poesiealbum (Neuklang 2011, with Johannes Lauer, Martin Gjakonovski, Bodek Janke)
 Fly Now (Contemplate 2014; with Kurt Rosenwinkel, Matt Penman, Obed Calvaire)
 C2J one featuring Jean-Lou Treboux (Neuklang 2015)

References

External links 
 
 Interview (2012, with Carina Prange)
 

Living people
1985 births
German women musicians
German film score composers
German jazz composers
German jazz singers
German jazz pianists
21st-century pianists
21st-century German musicians
21st-century German women